"In Your Arms" is a song by American DJ and producer Illenium and American rock band X Ambassadors. It was released on August 16, 2019, from his third studio album Ascend.

Content
The song’s described a person whom the singer loves and believes is his soul mate. Even through life’s inevitable hardships, the singer knows the two will stick together.

Live performance
Illenium and Sam Harris of X Ambassadors performed "In Your Arms" original version during Ascend Tour at famed LA arena Staples Center back in December 2019.

Other versions
On May 1, 2020, Illenium and X Ambassadors shared "In Your Arms" Stripped version.

Norwegian music producer Alan Walker remixed the song, and used a stripped-back, acoustic version.

Charts

Weekly charts

Year-end charts

References

2019 songs
Illenium songs
X Ambassadors songs
Songs written by Jason Evigan
Songs written by Sam Martin (singer)
Songs written by Eskeerdo
Songs written by Stefan Johnson
Songs written by Jordan Johnson (songwriter)
Songs written by Illenium
Song recordings produced by the Monsters & Strangerz